The Dead Walk is the third studio album by the American metalcore  band The Acacia Strain. It was produced by the band and Adam D. of Killswitch Engage. The album was released through Prosthetic Records. This is the band's first with drummer Kevin Boutot and final album with bassist Seth Coleman and guitarist Daniel Daponde.

Before its release the album was originally titled Victims and was set to be released on March 21, 2006. The album title was eventually changed to its current title and the release date for the album was then pushed back. The album was released on June 13, 2006.

Track listing

Personnel 

 The Acacia Strain
 Vincent Bennett – lead vocals
 Daniel "DL" Laskiewicz – guitar, programming
 Daniel “Outhouse” Daponde – guitar, bass, backing vocals 
 Seth Coleman – bass
 Kevin Boutot – drums

 Production
 Adam D. – producer, mixing
 Wayne Krupa – mixing
 Alan Douches – mastering
 Paul A. Romano – art direction, artwork, design

 Guest musicians
 Mike DC (Damnation AD) – vocals on "See You Next Tuesday", gang vocals
 Lou Tanuis (On Paths of Torment) – vocals on "Predator; Never Prey", gang vocals
 Phil Labonte (All That Remains) – vocals on "Predator; Never Prey", gang vocals
 Keith Holuk (Ligeia) – vocals on "Predator; Never Prey", gang vocals
 Nate Johnson (ex-Fit For An Autopsy) – vocals on "Predator; Never Prey", gang vocals
 Mitch Lucker (ex-Suicide Silence) – vocals on "Predator; Never Prey", gang vocals
 Rusty Asunder (Torn Asunder) – vocals on "The Dead Walk", gang vocals
 Tyler Schienost – gang vocals
 "Doofy" – gang vocals

Charts

Trivia 

 "See You Next Tuesday" uses the famous acronym normally spelled "C U Next Tuesday" and subliminally using the word "Cunt".

References 

2006 albums
Albums produced by Adam Dutkiewicz
The Acacia Strain albums